Charles Émile Joseph Léon Ferry (23 May 1834 – 21 July 1909) was a French politician.

Younger brother of Jules Ferry, Charles Ferry was born in Saint-Dié, in the département of Vosges. Charles was a businessman, becoming involved in national politics during the Franco-Prussian War when he served in Paris as aide to Jules Favre, Vice-President of the Government of National Defence.

After the war, Ferry was appointed prefect of Saône-et-Loire, then served as government commissioner in Corsica in October and November 1871, and prefect of Haute-Garonne after that until May 1873. Leaving government service, Ferry returned to business and banking.

In 1881 he was elected to the Chamber of Deputies to represent Épinal. He joined his brother in the ranks of the Opportunist Republicans. He served only a single term, not standing for reelection in 1885. He was elected to the Senate in 1888, representing the Vosges department, being replaced by his brother in 1891.

Charles Ferry was returned to the Chamber of Deputies in 1893, representing Saint-Dié. He was reelected in 1898 but defeated in 1902 by Edmond Gérard. Following this defeat Ferry left politics. He died in Paris.

Charles Ferry's son Abel was also a politician.

References
 
 

1834 births
1909 deaths
People from Saint-Dié-des-Vosges
Politicians from Grand Est
Opportunist Republicans
Progressive Republicans (France)
Members of the 3rd Chamber of Deputies of the French Third Republic
French Senators of the Third Republic
Senators of Vosges (department)
Members of the 6th Chamber of Deputies of the French Third Republic
Members of the 7th Chamber of Deputies of the French Third Republic
Prefects of France
Prefects of Saône-et-Loire
Prefects of Corsica (department)
Prefects of Haute-Garonne